Max Huwyler (6 December 1931 – 28 January 2023) was a Swiss writer.

Biography 
Originally, Huwyler was a high school teacher in Zürich. He wrote several books for children, theatre plays, poetry, fiction stories, and radio plays. He co-authored with Walter Flückiger a book in the volumes titled Welt der Wörter (World of Words) in 1983. His works include further texts for children, plays for the school stage, radio plays, poems, and children's books. He also translated plays by Elias Canetti and Günter Grass into Swiss German.

Huwyler was awarded the Swiss Youth Book Award in 1993, the Schiller Foundation Award in 1996 and the Recognition Award of the Zug Canton, the Central Swiss Media Award of the DRS Radio and the Zons Radio Drama Award in 2004.

Publications
 2010: Das Zebra ist das Zebra Illustrated by Jürg Obrist. Atlantis-Verlag, Zürich, .
 2003: D'Bremer Stadtmusikante und d'Gschicht vom föifte Bremer. Hörspiel Produktion, Zürich, .
 2000: De Stadtgarteschnägg script author. Zytglogge, Bern, .
 1997: Das Nashorn und das Nashorn Wrote with Vera Eggermann. Zytglogge, Bern, .
 1983: Welt der Wörter Wrote with Walter Flückiger, Lehrmittelverlag, Zürich, .

References

External links

https://web.archive.org/web/20120418032820/http://www.autillus.ch/plattforms/Huwyler_Max.html

1931 births
2023 deaths
Swiss male poets
Swiss poets in German
Swiss children's writers
People from Zug